Rex Pole Blundell (born 8 May 1942) is an Australian cricketer. He played twenty-four first-class and three List A matches for South Australia between 1964 and 1971.

See also
 List of South Australian representative cricketers

References

External links
 

1942 births
Living people
Australian cricketers
South Australia cricketers
Cricketers from Adelaide